Orlando Sardi de Lima (born 15 August 1950) is the current Ambassador of Colombia to Spain with dual accreditation to the Colombian missions in Andorra, Algeria and Morocco. An agricultural engineer from the University of Puerto Rico at Mayagüez, Sardi has also served as President of Proexport from 1998 to 2000, and has been in the directives of various private and public firms including Winchester Oil & Gas, Comagro, Banco Ganadero S.A, Bancóldex, and the Colombian Institute of Agricultural Marketing (Idema), he also worked in the presidential campaigns of Andrés Pastrana Arango, and Juan Manuel Santos.

See also
 Germán Santamaría Barragán

References

1950 births
Living people
People from Cali
University of Puerto Rico alumni
Agricultural engineers
Ambassadors of Colombia to Spain
Ambassadors of Colombia to Andorra
Ambassadors of Colombia to Algeria
Ambassadors of Colombia to Morocco